Walter Colbath (March 10, 1906 – March 24, 1986) was an American diver. He competed in the men's 10 metre platform event at the 1928 Summer Olympics.

References

1906 births
1986 deaths
American male divers
Olympic divers of the United States
Divers at the 1928 Summer Olympics
Sportspeople from Saginaw, Michigan